Prices Fork Historic District is a national historic district located at Prices Fork, Montgomery County, Virginia.  The district encompasses 13 contributing buildings in the village of Prices Fork. It includes a variety of vernacular residential, commercial, and institutional buildings dating to the 19th century. Notable buildings include the James Bain Price House (1871), Price Store (1871), Prices Fork Methodist Church, and St. Marks Lutheran Church (1877).

It was listed on the National Register of Historic Places in 1991, and increased in size in 2014.

References

Historic districts in Montgomery County, Virginia
Greek Revival architecture in Virginia
National Register of Historic Places in Montgomery County, Virginia
Historic districts on the National Register of Historic Places in Virginia